Rashaan Harvey Nall (born February 25, 1980) is an American writer, director, screenwriter and actor of stage and screen.

Early life 
Rashaan Nall was born in the Greater Los Angeles, California and raised in Altadena, California 
Nall attended South Pasadena High School wherein he played starting Tailback for the football team. Rashaan later attended John Muir High School in Altadena, California and was subsequently accepted into Los Angeles County High School for the Arts. After graduating, Rashaan attended California State University at Northridge while continuing to pursue his dream in entertainment.

Career

Acting 
Nall made his professional debut as a Voiceover artist on the Animated series Captain Planet as well as Television commercials such as McDonald's, Jenga and Toyota to name a few.

Nall later landed a Regular role as Jared Moore on the Paramount television series Social Studies, a show centered on the students of a wayward upper crust boarding school. Rashaan also recurred on the ABC hit series Hangin' with Mr. Cooper, NBC's Mr. Rhodes, The Bernie Mac Show and CBS mystery drama Cracker.

He appears in Feature films such as HBO's Tyson and Dancing in September as well as The Walt Disney Company Feature film principal.
As well as Fakin' the Funk,  Tin Soldier and many others while continuing to Guest Star on shows like Touched by an Angel, Sister, Sister and Without a Trace. Nall additionally Guest starred in Emmy nominated series’ Standoff and Blind Justice along with Emmy winning series’ such as NYPD Blue, and ER.

Rashaan etched his own brand of edgy comedy in memorable roles as Stray Bullet in the 5th installment of the Leprechaun franchise, Leprechaun in the Hood. Nall played the unassuming anti-hero Floyd in Snipes and as hard bodied Ronald in Star studded movie classic The Wash. Nall credits his experience on The Wash that inspired his love for Stand-up comedy.

Rashaan avoided being typecast and earned a reputation for intensive study character work, on the Emmy award-winning series The Shield and the VH1 Feature film drama Play'd: A Hip Hop Story Starring opposite Toni Braxton.

Nall made another comedic departure and landed the recurring  role of Walt Powell a barber/stand-up comedian on CW hit One on One and a regular on its spinoff series Cuts.
 
Nall then landed a Recurring role as Daryl on the critically acclaimed IFC series "The Minor Accomplishments of Jackie Woodman".

Rashaan took another dramatic turn as Cloudy in “Spoken Words” with writer/director of Oscar winning film Ulee's Gold, Victor Nuñez.

After groundbreaking years in the profession as one of Hollywood's most unique ensemble actors Nall continues his personal dedication to entertaining and engaging audiences across the world through laughter and healing. Rashaan Nall never ceases to push the envelope as an artist and continues to grow and mature in this challenging and rewarding business.

Writing 
Rashaan is one of the original poets of Los Angeles' "The Poetry Lounge". 
His screenplay, The Pyn, was a screenwriting finalist for HBO sponsored Urbanworld film festival in 2007. 
Nall also penned both screenplays Menage' Noir and Jesus Lovin' Buddhist, for which he wrote, produced, directed, and edited.

Directing 
Nall's first directorial work was theatrical re-telling of Sam Shepard's first act of Geography of a Horse Dreamer at Los Angeles's State playhouse.
Nall also directed Spaghetti Western satire "Jesus Lovin Buddhist", and the music video "Grrr" for Hip hop Artist Philly Swain under the pseudonym Ra Cinematic.

Editing 
Nall first began editing by sneaking into the editing bay of Otis College of Art and Design with a roommate and Otis student. Nall's first official short was entitled film Menage' Noir starring Crank: High Voltage's Julanne Chidi Hill and Amour Infinity's Jamie Burton Oare. 
Rashaan edited his rethinking of a spaghetti western "Jesus Lovin Buddhist" a satirical film exploring religion and race in a small town bar.  The film stars Dominic Bogart, Blake Robbins and Julanne Chidi Hill.

In December 2011, Rashaan also edited on special production projects for fashion maven Christian Audigier.

Personal life 
He currently resides in Rochester, NY

Spirituality 
Rashaan is from a Christian Baptist background and practices Kundalini yoga and Vipassana meditation.

Charity 
Rashaan volunteered as an assistant teacher at Marvin Avenue Elementary School with the nonprofit organization Equal Opportunity Productions (EqOp), an arts organization. Rashaan also served a three-year stint as assistant teacher at Faith acting studios and assistant teacher at All About Kids Acting conservatory.

Filmography 
Spoken Word (2009) 	... 	Cloudy	
Without a Trace (2007) 	... 	Evan Bingham		
Standoff (2006) 	... 	Jesse Roberts	
The Minor Accomplishments of Jackie Woodman (2006) 	... 	Darryl	
Cuts (2005–2006) 	... 	Walt Powell	
Blind Justice (2005) 	... 	Titus Oliver	
One on One (2002–2004) 	... 	Walt Powell	
The Shield (2004) 	... 	Tobar	
Play'd: A Hip Hop Story (2002) 	... 	Jaxx	
The Wash (2001) 	... 	Ronald	
Devil's Prey (2001) 	... 	Joe	
Snipes (2001) 	... 	Floyd	
Nash Bridges (2001) 	... 	Rafael Watson	
Something to Sing About (2000) 	... 	G Smooth	
Leprechaun in the Hood (2000) 	... 	Stray Bullet	
3 Strikes (2000) 	... 	T-Bird	
Dancing in September (2000) 	... 	Bad Actor	
Inferno (1998) 	... 	Lewis	
NYPD Blue (1998) 	... 	Donny	
Cracker (1998) 	... 	Darin Watlington	
Principal Takes a Holiday (1998) 	... 	Peter Heath (as Rashaan H. Nall)
Sister, Sister (1997) 	... 	Lil Dawg	
Touched by an Angel (1997) 	... 	Lightning	
Social Studies (1997) 	... 	Jared Moore	
Fakin' Da Funk (1997) 	... 	Perry Lee	
Mr. Rhodes (1996) 	... 	Lucas	
ER (1996) 	... 	Brett	
Hangin' with Mr. Cooper (1995) 	... 	Young Mark	
The Tin Soldier (1995) 	... 	Pack Kid	
The Parent 'Hood (1995) 	... 	Kwame	
Tyson (1995) 	... 	Dog

References

External links

1980 births
Living people
Male actors from California
American male film actors
American male child actors
American male television actors
People from Altadena, California
20th-century American male actors
21st-century American male actors
African-American male actors
20th-century African-American people
21st-century African-American people